

327001–327100 

|-id=030
| 327030 Alanmaclure ||  || Alan McClure (1929–2005), an American amateur astronomer, comet photographer and member at the Stony Ridge Observatory, California † || 
|-id=082
| 327082 Tournesol ||  || Professor Calculus, a fictional character in The Adventures of Tintin, the series of graphic albums written and illustrated by Belgian artist Hergé. || 
|}

327101–327200 

|-bgcolor=#f2f2f2
| colspan=4 align=center | 
|}

327201–327300 

|-bgcolor=#f2f2f2
| colspan=4 align=center | 
|}

327301–327400 

|-bgcolor=#f2f2f2
| colspan=4 align=center | 
|}

327401–327500 

|-id=421
| 327421 Yanamandra || 2005 WP || Padma Yanmandra-Fisher (born 1957) is a senior research scientist for the Space Science Institute (formerly at JPL), studying light interactions in various media (planetary atmospheres, rings, comets and the solar corona), while expanding scientific outreach and professional-citizen collaboration in astronomy. || 
|}

327501–327600 

|-id=512
| 327512 Bíró ||  || László Bíró (1899–1985), Hungarian inventor of the easy-to-use writing implement generally known as the "biro" in Britain and the ballpoint pen in the U.S. || 
|}

327601–327700 

|-id=632
| 327632 Ferrarini ||  || Valérie Ferrarini (born 1968) is an amateur astronomer from the south of France. She is a member of the Astronomes Amateurs Aixois de l'Observatoire de Vauvenargues. || 
|-id=695
| 327695 Yokoono ||  || Yoko Ono (born 1933) is an iconic figure in avant-garde and performance art in the late 20th and early 21st century. Her work encompasses both visual and musical arts, the latter including notable collaborations with her husband John Lennon. Ono has also advocated tirelessly for peace for over fifty years. || 
|}

327701–327800 

|-bgcolor=#f2f2f2
| colspan=4 align=center | 
|}

327801–327900 

|-bgcolor=#f2f2f2
| colspan=4 align=center | 
|}

327901–328000 

|-id=943
| 327943 Xavierbarcons ||  || Xavier Barcons (born 1959) is a Spanish physicist and Director General of the European Southern Observatory. Barcons' research has been focused on astronomy in the X-ray wavelengths for the study of distant quasar spectra. || 
|-id=982
| 327982 Balducci ||  || Genoveffa Balducci (born 1954) is an Italian surgeon and Director of Emergency Surgery at the Sant'Andrea hospital in Rome. A general surgery lecturer at "La Sapienza" University of Rome, he is the author of about 200 scientific publications. || 
|-id=989
| 327989 Howieglatter ||  || Charles Howard ("Howie") Glatter (1946–2017), was a very talented New York-based entrepreneur who developed and manufactured some of astronomy's most sought after state-of-the art collimation tools. He was also an inventor of several other innovative astronomy products that advanced amateur astronomy. || 
|}

References 

327001-328000